The GE 110-ton switcher is a diesel-electric locomotive model built by GE Transportation Systems.  It was intended for use in light switching duties.

External links 

RR Pictures Archive GE 110 Photos

110-ton switcher
B-B locomotives
Diesel-electric locomotives of the United States
Standard gauge locomotives of the United States